"Incommunicado" is a song by British neo-progressive rock band Marillion. It served as the lead single from their fourth studio album, Clutching at Straws (1987). Released on 11 May 1987, it reached number six on the UK Singles Chart, becoming the band's third top-10 hit and their last until 2004's "You're Gone". It also became a top-40 hit in Ireland, the Netherlands, Switzerland, and West Germany, as well as on the US Album Rock Tracks chart. It has been described by music writer Paul Stenning as "the most original commercial composition of all time."

Composition and release
The A-side is a fast, anthemic rock song with a repeated chorus and dominant keyboards from Mark Kelly. Kelly's solo was later cited as an inspiration by Adam Wakeman. Lead singer and lyricist Fish acknowledged a similarity between the song and the work of the Who.

The extended version on the twelve-inch and CD singles is slightly longer than the album version and features some additional sound effects. The B-side, the short, slow and introspective "Going Under", would also appear as a bonus track on the CD version of Clutching at Straws, in a slightly different version. Both tracks were written and arranged by Marillion and produced by Chris Kimsey.

The line "currently residing in the where-are-they-now file" is a reference to a scene in the film This Is Spinal Tap.

A CD replica of the single was also part of a collectors box-set released in July 2000 which contained Marillion's first twelve singles and was re-issued as a 3-CD set in 2009 (see The Singles '82–'88).

Cover art
The cover was designed by the band's regular artist at the time, Mark Wilkinson; however, instead of the usual airbrush style, it was a collage based on a colourised photograph of fans waiting outside the Marquee Club, then still in Wardour Street (there are some posters advertising a Then Jerico gig on the door). Only the eccentrically dressed, pivotal "angel" character (an alternate design of the Torch character who appears on the Clutching at Straws album cover) standing at the door apart from the crowd, was painted in Wilkinson's traditional style. The scene alludes to the song's main topic, success alienating artists from their fans and reality in general. On the back cover there is a quotation supposedly from Seneca the Younger's Moral Epistles ("This mime of mortal life, in which we are apportioned roles we misinterpret.")

Track listings
7-inch single
A. "Incommunicado"
B. "Going Under"

12-inch and CD single
A1. "Incommunicado" (album version)
B1. "Incommunicado" (alternative mix)
B2. "Going Under"

Charts

References

External links
 Music video on YouTube
 Live performance from 1987 on YouTube

1987 singles
1987 songs
EMI Records singles
Marillion songs
Song recordings produced by Chris Kimsey
Songs written by Fish (singer)
Songs written by Ian Mosley
Songs written by Mark Kelly (keyboardist)
Songs written by Pete Trewavas
Songs written by Steve Rothery